TV2 Stars is a one-off collection of New Zealand celebrities who appeared on programmes featured in TV2 in 2000.  Together they sang a rendition of Sonny & Cher's "I Got You Babe", named "I Got 2 Babe".

TVNZ used the song as their adverts throughout 2000–2001, as well as releasing the single.

Discography

Singles

Featured appearances
The group have appeared on some compilations since their debut in 2000 in New Zealand.  The following is a list of these albums that have featured tracks by the TV2 Stars.

 (????) – 100% Hits v5 (label unknown) – I Got 2 Babe

New Zealand musical groups
TVNZ